Growin' Up is the third studio album by American country music artist Luke Combs. It was released on June 24, 2022, through Columbia Records Nashville and River House Records. The album includes the singles "Doin' This", "The Kind of Love We Make" and "Going, Going, Gone" which impacted country radio on October 24. Growin' Up was nominated for Best Country Album at the 65th Annual Grammy Awards.

Content
Combs confirmed the album's track listing on May 17, 2022. The album consists of twelve tracks, including lead single "Doin' This" which went to number one on Billboard Country Airplay earlier in 2022. The second single "The Kind of Love We Make" was released in June 2022, and reached a peak of number 2 on the Country Airplay chart, becoming Combs' first single to miss number one on that chart. The album also features a duet with Miranda Lambert on "Outrunnin' Your Memory". Combs wrote the album's songs over a two-year period, and worked with Chip Matthews and Jonathan Singleton as producers.

Commercial performance
Growin' Up debuted at number two on the US Billboard 200 with 74,000 album-equivalent units, of which 28,000 were pure album sales. It is Combs' fourth top-five album in the US, and the highest debut for a country album in 2022.

Track listing

Personnel
Jim "Moose" Brown – keyboards
Luke Combs – acoustic guitar, lead vocals
Jon Conley – acoustic guitar
Billy Justineau – keyboards
Miranda Lambert – duet vocals on "Outrunnin' Your Memory"
Steve Mackey – bass guitar
Chip Matthews – electric guitar, keyboards, percussion, programming, background vocals
Rob McNelley – electric guitar
Greg Morrow – drums
Gary Morse – pedal steel guitar
Sol Philcox-Littlefield – electric guitar
Jerry Roe – drums
Scotty Sanders – pedal steel guitar
Adam Shoenfeld – electric guitar
Jonathan Singleton – bass guitar, electric guitar, background vocals
Travis Toy – pedal steel guitar
Mike Waldron – acoustic guitar, electric guitar
Charlie Worsham – acoustic guitar
Derek Wells – electric guitar

Charts

Weekly charts

Year-end charts

References

2022 albums
Albums produced by Jonathan Singleton
Albums produced by Luke Combs
Columbia Records albums
Luke Combs albums